Stolen Paradise (Spanish:Paraíso robado) is a 1952 Argentine film directed by José Arturo Pimentel. It was released in Argentina, Venezuela, and Spain.

Plot 
Marcela loses her mental health when her boyfriend dies. Carlos, an old teacher, helps in her recovery and a romance starts between them.

Cast

Cast

Production

Release dates

Technical specs 

 Runtime: 77 min
 Sound Mix: Mono
 Color: Black and White
 Aspect Ratio: 1.37 : 1

References

External links
 

1952 films
1950s Spanish-language films
Argentine black-and-white films
Argentine drama films
1952 drama films
1950s Argentine films